Meta Mayne Reid (1905–1991) was a Northern Irish children's writer.

Early life and education

Meta Mayne Reid was born to Marcus and Elvina Hopkins in Woodlesford, Yorkshire in 1905 and grew up there although her family was from Ulster in Ireland. She had one sister, Audrey. She was educated at home through governesses before going to Leeds Girls' High School. Mayne Reid went on to attend Manchester University. Later she moved to Crawfordsburn in County Down when her parents returned to the north of Ireland and there she was married to Dr E. Mayne Reid.

Work
It was in Ulster that she set most of her novels, both historical fiction and modern settings with a fantasy side. She wrote more than twenty children's novels as well as two novels for adults and one collection of poetry. Reid was involved with the Belfast chapter of PEN as both secretary and, from 1970 to 1972, president.

Bibliography

Novels
The Land Is Dear, 1936 
Far-Off Fields Are Green, 1937

Children's books
Phelim and the Creatures, 1952
Carrigmore Castle, 1954
All Because of Dawks, 1955
Dawks Does It Again, 1956
The Cuckoo at Coolnean, 1956
Tiffany and the Swallow Rhyme, 1956
Dawks on Robbers' Mountain, 1957
Dawks and the Duchesss, 1958
Strangers in Carrigmore, 1958
The McNeills at Rathcapple, 1959 
Storm on Kildoney, 1961
Sandy and the Hollow Book, 1961
The Tobermillin Oracle, 1962
With Angus in the Forest, 1963
The Tinkers' Summer, 1965 
The Silver Fighting Cocks, 1966
The House at Spaniard's Bay, 1967
The Glen Beyond the Door, 1968
The Two Rebels, 1969 
Beyond the Wide World's End, 1972
The Plotters of Pollnashee, 1973 
Snowbound by the Whitewater, 1975
The Noguls and the Horse, 1976
A Dog Called Scampi, 1980

Poetry
No Ivory Tower, 1974

References

1905 births
1991 deaths
20th-century British women writers
Irish children's writers
Irish women children's writers
British children's writers
British women children's writers